Gary Muller and Danie Visser were the defending champions, but lost in the quarterfinals this year.

Jakob Hlasek and Yevgeny Kafelnikov won the title, defeating Martin Damm and Patrick Rafter 6–7, 7–6, 7–6 in the final.

Seeds

  Tom Nijssen /  Cyril Suk (semifinals)
  Menno Oosting /  Daniel Vacek (first round)
  Olivier Delaître /  Diego Nargiso (semifinals)
  Gary Muller /  Danie Visser (quarterfinals)

Draw

Draw

External links
 Main Draw

1994 ATP Tour